Roy Baines (born 7 February 1950) is an English former professional football player and manager..

Career
Born in Derby, Baines played as a goalkeeper for Derby County, Hibernian, Greenock Morton, Celtic and St Johnstone, before becoming manager of Tranent. Baines moved from Greenock Morton to Celtic in October 1976, in what The Glasgow Herald described as a "surprise move."

References

1950 births
Living people
English footballers
English football managers
Derby County F.C. players
Hibernian F.C. players
Greenock Morton F.C. players
Celtic F.C. players
St Johnstone F.C. players
Scottish Football League players
Footballers from Derby
Association football goalkeepers